Cyclophora decussata is a moth in the family Geometridae. It is found in Suriname, French Guiana and Brazil.

Subspecies
Cyclophora decussata decussata
Cyclophora decussata curvisignata (Prout, 1938) (Brazil)

References

Moths described in 1855
Cyclophora (moth)
Moths of South America